Nicolás Celis Ríos (born October 24, 1984) is a Peruvian footballer who plays as a center forward. He currently plays for Colegio Nacional de Iquitos in the Peruvian First Division.

Club career

Early career 
Nicolás developed as a footballer in C.D. Universidad Nacional de la Amazonía Peruana (Deportivo UNAP). There he played in the District League of Iquitos. Then in 2005 he joined Iquito's biggest club Colegio Nacional de Iquitos for the 2005 Copa Perú, which they were eliminated from in the Round of 16 by Olímpico Somos Perú 3-3 on aggregate.

FBC Melgar
Then in 2006 Celis would have a very short stint playing for Peruvian First Division club FBC Melgar, Arequipa's most popular club. Celis made his official debut in the Peruvian First Division with FBC Melgar on March 12, 2006 in the 2006 season.
He came on in the 77th minute for José Carlos Fernández, and his club went on to defeat Unión Huaral 3-1 at home. His manager at the time Teddy Cardama allowed Nicolás to play the following match, away to Sporting Cristal. He entered the match replacing José Carlos Fernández in the 80th minute, but his club still lost 3-0. This would be his last appearance for FBC Melgar.

Asociación Deportiva Hospital
Then he in 2007 he joined Pucallpa based club Asociación Deportiva Hospital, which was playing in the Copa Perú division at the time. In the 2007 Copa Perú season, his club managed to make it all the way to the semifinals. There they were eliminated by the eventual champions that season, Club Juan Aurich, 3-1 on aggregate.

Return to Colegio Nacional Iquitos
Then in 2008 he returned to Colegio Nacional de Iquitos and helped them reach promotion at the end of the 2008 Copa Perú season. Celis played a part in the last three defining matches for promotion to the Peruvian First Division. They eventually finished one point behind the champions Sport Huancayo but were still granted promotion.

Celis made his Peruvian First Division debut in Colegio Nacional de Iquitos colors in Round 1 of the 2009 Torneo Descentralizado season at home against Sporting Cristal. He was in the starting line-up and then was substituted by Andrei Reátegui in the 71st minute of the match, which finished in a scoreless draw.

References

External links

1984 births
Living people
People from Iquitos
Peruvian footballers
Copa Perú players
Colegio Nacional Iquitos footballers
FBC Melgar footballers
Deportivo Hospital footballers
José Gálvez FBC footballers
Peruvian Primera División players
Association football forwards